Sander van der Marck (born 20 December 1972) is a Dutch rower. He competed in the men's quadruple sculls event at the 1996 Summer Olympics.

References

External links
 

1972 births
Living people
Dutch male rowers
Olympic rowers of the Netherlands
Rowers at the 1996 Summer Olympics
Sportspeople from Delft